Season 3 of Satisfaction began airing on 8 December 2009, and ended on 9 February 2010. Satisfaction continued to air on Foxtel's Showcase channel, airing all 10 episodes for the 2nd season. Season 3 saw the departures of Chloe, Diana Glenn and Heather, Peta Sergeant and the new arrivals of Tess, Renai Caruso and Amy, Camille Keenan.

Cast

Starring
Kestie Morassi as Natalie
Madeleine West as Mel
Dustin Clare as Sean
Alison Whyte as Lauren
Camille Keenan as Amy
Renai Caruso as Tess

Guest Starring
Grant Bowler as Daniel
John McCoy as Robert
Shane Conner as Karl

Special Guest Star
Madeleine West as Mel

Episodes

Release
On 5 October 2010, Satisfaction season 3 was released on DVD, featuring, 10 episodes, and plenty of special features.

Notes

References
 http://www.ezydvd.com.au/item.zml/808104

2009 Australian television seasons
2010 Australian television seasons
Satisfaction (Australian TV series)